PU, Pu, or pu may refer to:

Organizations

Political parties

 Ummah Party (Indonesia) (Partai Ummat), a political party in Indonesia

People and names 

 Pu (Chinese surname), shared by several people
 Pu (Indian given name), shared by several people
 Pu Ling-en (born 1936), a pen name of British poet J.H. Prynne
 Pu Yen (1900–2008), Thai centenarian who lived to an age of 108
 Yingluck Shinawatra (born 1967), nicknamed Pu, Thai businesswoman and politician

Places
 Pu County, in Shanxi, China
 Guinea-Bissau, a country in West Africa (NATO country code PU)
 Province of Pesaro and Urbino, a province in the Marche region of Italy

Schools

In India
 Panjab University, Chandigarh, a university in India
 Patna University, a university in Bihar, India
 Pondicherry University, a central university in Puducherry, India

In the United States
 Parker University, a university in Dallas, Texas, United States
 Point University, a university in West Point, Georgia, United States
 Princeton University, a university in Princeton, New Jersey, United States
 Purdue University, a university in West Lafayette, Indiana, United States

In other countries
 Pokhara University, a university in Pokhara, Nepal
 University of the Punjab, a public university in Lahore, Pakistan
 University of the Punjab, Gujranwala, a public university in Gujranwala, Pakistan
 University of Plovdiv, a public university in Plovdiv, Bulgaria
 Prešov University, a public university in Prešov, Slovakia
 Providence University, a university in Taichung, Taiwan

Science and technology
 Plutonium, symbol Pu, a chemical element
 Processing unit, an electronic circuit that performs operations on some external data source
 Polyurethane, a common type of plastic
 pu, a label in the per-unit system of power systems analysis
 PU learning, a collection of semisupervised techniques in machine learning
 PU leather or bicast leather, a material made with split leather and polyurethane
 PU resistor, a pull-up resistor
 PU scope, a sniper scope of Soviet origin
Power Unit, component that powers a machine, a vehicle, or a train. Almost equivalent to an engine.

Other uses
 Pu (Taoism), early Taoist metaphor for the natural state of humanity
PU, an abbreviation for Proto-Ukrainian, an aspect of the Old East Slavic language
pu, the Toki Pona name for the book Toki Pona: The Language of Good
"Pu", a song by Arca from Kick IIIII
 , the Charonia tritonis

See also
 Poo (disambiguation)
 Peugh (disambiguation)
 Pue (disambiguation)
 Pew (disambiguation)
 Pugh (disambiguation)
 Pickup (disambiguation)
 Pull up (disambiguation)